The 2018 England women's Tri-Nation Series was a cricket tournament that took place in England in June and July 2018. It was a tri-nation series between England women, South Africa women and the New Zealand women cricket teams. The matches were played as Women's Twenty20 International (WT20I) fixtures, with two matches were played each day. The top two teams progressed to the final on 1 July 2018.

In the opening fixture of the series, New Zealand set a new record for the highest innings total in WT20Is, scoring 216 runs for the loss of one wicket against South Africa, in their 20 overs. Hours later on the same day, England broke the record, by scoring 250 runs for the loss of three wickets, also against South Africa. England went on to beat South Africa by 121 runs to record their biggest winning margin, in terms of runs, in WT20Is.

In the fifth match, New Zealand beat South Africa by eight wickets. Thefefore, New Zealand and England both progressed to the final, with South Africa being eliminated. In the following match, New Zealand's Suzie Bates became the second woman, after Jenny Gunn, to play in her 100th WT20I match. England won the tri-series, beating New Zealand by seven wickets in the final.

Squads

When England announced their squad they said that Katie George and Lauren Winfield would only be in the squad for their double-header on 23 June. Natasha Farrant was also added to England's squad for the double-header.

Points table

WT20I series

1st WT20I

2nd WT20I

3rd WT20I

4th WT20I

5th WT20I

6th WT20I

Final

References

External links
 Series home at ESPN Cricinfo

2018 in English women's cricket
2018 in South African cricket
2018 in New Zealand cricket
International cricket competitions in 2018
International women's cricket competitions in England
cricket
cricket
Women's Twenty20 cricket international competitions
2018 in women's cricket